The Secretary for Development of the Hong Kong Government is responsible for planning, land development and public works related development policy in Hong Kong.  The position was created in 2007 to replace portions of the previous portfolios of Secretary for the Environment, Transport and Works and Secretary for Housing, Planning and Lands.

List of office holders
Political party:

Surveyor General, 1842–1891

Directors of Public Works, 1891–1941

Directors of Public Works, 1946–1981

 Development issues were handled by Secretary for Lands and Works between 1981 and 1989.

Secretaries for Works, 1989–1997

Secretaries for Works, 1997–2002

 Development issues were handled by Secretary for the Environment, Transport and Works between 2002 and 2007.

Secretaries for Development, 2007–present

See also
 Public Works Department (Hong Kong)

References

External links

Organisation chart of Hong Kong Government

Development
Land management ministries